Briar Rose may refer to:

Folklore
 "Little Briar Rose", also called "Sleeping Beauty", a folk tale originally recorded by the Brothers Grimm

Characters
 Briar Rose, a pseudonym used by Princess Aurora in Walt Disney's 1959 film Sleeping Beauty
 Briar Rose, a character in Fables, a comic book series by Bill Willingham
 Briar Rose, a non-player character from the RPG Fable: The Lost Chapters, developed by Big Blue Box
 Briar Rose, a pseudonym used by Princess Raisa in The Seven Realms series of novels by Cinda Williams Chima
 Briar Rose (Ibara), a character in the anime show Otogi-Jushi Akazukin
 Briar Rose, Aurora's mother's name in the TV show Once Upon a Time

Literature
 Briar Rose (novel), a 1992 novel by Jane Yolen
 Briar Rose, a novella by Robert Coover

Other uses
 Rosa rubiginosa, also known as sweet briar, a flowering plant
 The Legend of Briar Rose, a series of paintings by the Pre-Raphaelite artist Edward Burne-Jones
 Briar Rose (band), a traditional heavy metal band from Swansea, Massachusetts, USA
 "Briar Rose" (Dollhouse), the eleventh episode of Dollhouse